Mellette may refer to:

Mellette, South Dakota
Mellette County, South Dakota
Mellette House,  Watertown, South Dakota
USS Mellette (APA-156)

People with the surname
Aaron Mellette (born 1989), American football player
Arthur C. Mellette (1842–1896), American politician